Conrad Schick (1822–1901) was a German architect, archaeologist and Protestant missionary who settled in Jerusalem in the mid-nineteenth century. For many decades he was head of the "House of Industry" at the Christ Church, which was the institute for vocational training of the  London Society for Promoting Christianity Amongst the Jews.

Biography
Conrad Schick was born in Bitz, Kingdom of Württemberg, Germany. At the age of 24, after completing his studies in Basel, he settled in Palestine in October 1846. The St. Chrischona Pilgrim Mission at Bettingen sent him out as missionary.

When Schick died in Jerusalem in 1901, he was mourned by Jews, Muslims and Christians alike. He was buried in the Protestant cemetery on Mount Zion.

Architecture

The house that Schick built for his family, Tabor House, or Beit Tavor in Hebrew, on Jerusalem's Street of the Prophets, is still standing. The name of the house is based on a verse from Psalms (89:12): "The north and the south, Thou has created them; Tabor and Hermon shall rejoice in Thy name." The façade is decorated with carvings of palm leaves and the Greek letters Alpha and Omega, symbolizing the beginning and the end. The house was bought in 1951 by Swedish Protestants and now houses the Swedish Theological Institute for religious instruction and Land of Israel studies.

Schick was chosen to design Mea Shearim, one of the first neighbourhoods in Jerusalem built outside the walls of the Old City.

In 1887, Schick designed the Unity of the Brethren lepers' hospital Jesus Hilfe, since 1885 led by his son-in-law Dr. Adalbert Einsler (1848–1919), a landmark building (later the Hansen Government Hospital for Lepers, now an art and culture center) that can still be seen today near the Jerusalem Theater in Talbiya.

Other buildings designed by Schick are St Paul's Anglican Chapel in Jerusalem (now St Paul's Church, see Anglican Diocese of Jerusalem) and the German Deaconesses Hospital (today the eastern wing of Bikur Holim Hospital), both on Street of the Prophets.

Archaeology
Schick is also remembered for his fifty years of archaeological investigations of Jerusalem and its surroundings. He worked for many years for the Palestine Exploration Fund, publishing frequently in the Fund's journal. In 1872, Schick was permitted to conduct research on the Temple Mount, which was generally off limits to non-Muslims. Consequently, he built models of the Temple Mount (see below).

Schick was involved in the discovery and initial study of the Siloam Inscription describing how the Siloam Tunnel was finished, probably in the days of King Hezekiah of Judah.

In 1874 Schick was the first scholar to publish a description of the Garden Tomb, and in 1901 he rejected General Charles Gordon's theory of it being the tomb of Jesus.

Biblical models

Schick constructed a notable series of models of the Muslim buildings of the Haram al-Sharif on the Temple Mount, and some somewhat outdated replicas of the Jewish Temple based on the information available in his time.

Two wooden models of the Temple Mount he built were exhibited in the Turkish pavilion at the Vienna World Exposition of 1873. Haim Goren of Tel-Hai Academic College says that one of the models, measuring 4 by 3 meters, did not find a buyer after the end of the World Fair. It was housed at the Chrischona mission near Basel, Switzerland for 138 years. It was recently purchased by Christ Church in the Old City of Jerusalem.
King Charles I of Württemberg bought the other and subsequently raised Schick to the rank of Royal Württembergian Hofbaurat (Privy Construction Councillor) for his excellent work.

His replica of the biblical Tabernacle was visited in Jerusalem by several crowned heads of state, toured the United Kingdom, and was exhibited at the 1873 Vienna World Fair.

Schick built a replica of the Temple Mount and Dome of the Rock for the Ottoman Sultan. His final model, in four sections, each representing the Temple Mount as it appeared in a particular era, was exhibited at the St. Louis World's Fair of 1904.

Two models of the Temple Mount created by Schick are located in the basement of the Paulus-Haus museum on Nablus Road, just outside the Old City of Jerusalem near the Damascus Gate. One model shows the Temple Mount as it was in the 1870s, based on his research. The other is a somewhat fanciful model of the Jewish Temple.

Commemoration
The Conrad Schick Library at Christ Church, in the Old City of Jerusalem, is named for him. So is the alley leading to the entrance of The Garden Tomb.

Assorted writings

See also

Architecture of Israel
Archaeology of Israel

References

Bibliography

 Goldhill, Simon (2005). The Temple of Jerusalem. Harvard University Press, p. 129,

External links
 [conradschick.wordpress.com Official website dedicated to Conrad Schick]
 Four Paths to Jerusalem Hunt Janin

19th-century German architects
Architects in Ottoman Palestine
Archaeologists of the Near East
Biblical archaeologists
19th century in Jerusalem
1822 births
1901 deaths
Burials at Mount Zion (Protestant)
Expatriates in Ottoman Palestine
German Protestant missionaries
Protestant missionaries in Palestine (region)